The Austria men's national 3x3 team is the 3x3 basketball team representing Austria in international men's competitions.

The team competed at the 2021 FIBA 3x3 Olympic Qualifying Tournament hoping to qualify for the 2020 Summer Olympics in Tokyo, Japan. The team qualified for the tournament as host nation as the tournament was held in Graz, Austria.

World Cup record

References

External links

Austria national basketball team
Men's national 3x3 basketball teams